The battle in Liuzhou took place from June 7 to 18, 1929. The location was in central Guangxi, China. The two warring parties in Liuzhou were Hunan Army and Guangxi Army on the other.

References
中華民國國防大學編，《中國現代軍事史主要戰役表》
1929 in China
Conflicts in 1929